Geryonidae is a family of crabs, including the following genera and species:

Chaceon Manning & Holthuis, 1989
Chaceon affinis (A. Milne-Edwards & Bouvier, 1894)
Chaceon albus Davie, Ng & Dawson, 2007
Chaceon alcocki Ghosh & Manning, 1993
Chaceon atopus Manning & Holthuis, 1989
Chaceon australis Manning, 1993
Chaceon bicolor Manning & Holthuis, 1989
Chaceon chilensis Chirino-Gálvez & Manning, 1989
Chaceon chuni (Macpherson, 1983)
Chaceon collettei Manning, 1992
Chaceon crosnieri Manning & Holthuis, 1989
Chaceon eldorado Manning & Holthuis, 1989
Chaceon erytheiae (Macpherson, 1984)
Chaceon fenneri (Manning & Holthuis, 1984)
Chaceon gordonae (Ingle, 1985)
Chaceon goreni Galil & Manning, 2001
Chaceon granulatus (Sakai, 1978)
Chaceon imperialis Manning, 1992
Chaceon inghami (Manning & Holthuis, 1986)
Chaceon inglei Manning & Holthuis, 1989
Chaceon karubar Manning, 1993
Chaceon macphersoni (Manning & Holthuis, 1988)
Chaceon manningi Ng, Lee & Yu, 1994
Chaceon maritae (Manning & Holthuis, 1981)
Chaceon mediterraneus Manning & Holthuis, 1989
Chaceon micronesicus Ng & Manning, 1998
Chaceon notialis Manning & Holthuis, 1989
Chaceon paulensis (Chun, 1903)
Chaceon poupini Manning, 1992
Chaceon quinquedens (Smith, 1879)
Chaceon ramosae Manning, Tavares & Albuquerque, 1989
Chaceon sanctaehelenae Mannig & Holthuis, 1989
Chaceon sanctahelenae Manning & Holthuis, 1989
Chaceon somaliensis Manning, 1993
Chaceon yaldwyni Manning, Dawson & Webber, 1990
Geryon Krøyer, 1837
Geryon longipes A. Milne-Edwards, 1882
Geryon trispinosus (Herbst, 1803)
Zariquieyon Manning & Holthuis, 1989
Zariquieyon inflatus Manning & Holthuis, 1989

References

External links

Portunoidea
Decapod families